The First Fisher ministry (Labour) was the 6th ministry of the Government of Australia. It was led by the country's 5th Prime Minister, Andrew Fisher. The First Fisher ministry succeeded the Second Deakin ministry, which dissolved on 13 November 1908 after Labour withdrew their support and Alfred Deakin was forced to resign. The ministry was replaced by the Third Deakin ministry on 2 June 1909 after the Protectionist Party and the Anti-Socialist Party merged into the Liberal Party "fusion" and withdrew their support in order to form what became the first majority government in federal Australian history.

Billy Hughes, who died in 1952, was the last surviving member of the First Fisher ministry; Hughes was also the last surviving member of the Watson ministry, Third Fisher ministry, Second Hughes ministry and Third Hughes ministry.

Ministry

References

Ministries of Edward VII
Fisher, 1
Australian Labor Party ministries
1908 establishments in Australia
1909 disestablishments in Australia
Cabinets established in 1908
Cabinets disestablished in 1909